The president of the Sahrawi Arab Democratic Republic is the head of state of the partially recognized Sahrawi Arab Democratic Republic (SADR), a government in exile based in the Sahrawi refugee camps of Tindouf, Algeria. 

From the declaration of independence on February 27, 1976 to August 1982, the head of state of the SADR was known as the chairman of the Revolutionary Council. The office of the president of the SADR was established in August 1982, after a change in the constitution made by the fifth general congress of the Polisario Front, where it was decided the post were to be held by the Secretary-General of the Polisario. The first President was Mohamed Abdelaziz from August 1982 until his death in 2016.

The powers of the presidency are extensive, and they have been subject to modification in various constitutional amendments, the last occurring in 1995.

Chairmen/Presidents of the Sahrawi Arab Democratic Republic (1976–present)

Timeline

See also
 History of Western Sahara
 List of colonial governors of Spanish Sahara
 Prime Minister of the Sahrawi Arab Democratic Republic

Explanatory notes

References

External links
 President of the SADR photo gallery
 World Statesmen – Western Sahara

 
Government of the Sahrawi Arab Democratic Republic
Politics of Western Sahara